Estonian Karate Federation (abbreviation EKF) is one of the sport governing bodies in Estonia which deals with karate.

EKF is a legal successor of Estonian SSR Judo and Karate Federation which was established in 1974.

See also
 Estonian Judo Federation

References

External links
 

Sports governing bodies in Estonia
Martial arts in Estonia
Karate organizations